The Higher Education and Training Awards Council (HETAC), the legal successor to the National Council for Educational Awards (NCEA), granted higher education awards in Ireland beyond the university system from 2001 to 2012. HETAC was created in 2001, subject to the policies of the National Qualifications Authority of Ireland, and, specifically, granted qualifications at many Institutes of Technology and other colleges. HETAC was dissolved and its functions were passed to Quality and Qualifications Ireland (QQI) on 6 November 2012.

History

NCEA

In 1967 the Steering Committee on Technical Education recommended the creation of a body to control non-university higher qualifications, and in 1969 the Higher Education Authority similarly recommended the establishment of a "Council for National Awards" to better organise the non-university higher education sector; the HEA recommendations were tentative, to be refined after application to the work of the newly-established National Institute for Higher Education, Limerick. Following these recommendations, the National Council for Educational Awards (NCEA) was founded in April 1972 on an ad-hoc basis. The Minister for Education, Padraig Faulkner, specified its terms of reference, including the promotion and coordination of industrial, professional, commercial and scientific education, and the conferring of certificates, diplomas and degrees.  The NCEA granted the first National Certificates, 93 in number, in 1972; these were awarded at five Regional Technical Colleges. The NCEA granted its first bachelor degrees, to four students in Physical Education, in 1974.

Early on it was decided that the NCEA would be the only extra-university award-conferring institution in the State for higher education, rather than having a multitude of competing institutions, with authority to grant awards at all academic levels including degree level. Hence it was the award-granting body for NIHE Limerick, for example. Despite this, the Fine Gael-Labour (National Coalition) government limited the NCEA to sub-degree awards only from early 1976, and the later Fianna Fáil government of 1977 restored its full powers in November 1977, and placed the NCEA on a statutory footing in 1980 by commencing the National Council for Educational Awards Act, 1979.

In 1982 the first master's degree is awarded at NIHE Limerick in Arts, Business Studies and Engineering, and in 1985 the first doctorate degree was awarded at NIHE Dublin.

The founding director of the National Council for Educational Awards was Padraig Mac Diarmada, whose educational vision and philosophy contributed to further development of higher and continuing education in Ireland and whose vision enabled students to attain educational qualifications which would never have been envisioned by them prior to 1972. The last director (CEO) of the council was former Holy Trinity NS (Donaghmede) national school teacher and former INTO President Séamus Puirséil (Seamus Purcell).

Establishment of HETAC
HETAC was created in 2001 under the Qualifications (Education and Training) Act, 1999 (Section 21). It inherited the work of the NCEA, validating and awarding qualifications up to degree level, for the institutes of technology and a wide range of third-level institutions.

The first chief executive of HETAC was the former head of the NCEA, Seamus Puirseil. He was succeeded in 2008 by Gearóid Ó Conluain, formerly Deputy Chief Inspector of Department of Education and Science.

Merger into QQI
In October 2008 the Irish Government announced its intention to amalgamate HETAC with FETAC and NQAI, the two other bodies established under the Qualifications Act, while also incorporating the functions for the external review of Irish universities then carried out by the Irish Universities Quality Board. The Minister appointed an interim board for the new agency. This board appointed Dr. Padraig Walsh as chief executive Designate in September 2010. In February 2011, Dr. Walsh became chief executive of HETAC, pending the establishment of the new statutory agency.

Awards
In 2004 HETAC completed the transition from awards derived from the NCEA standards to a new awards system based on the National Framework of Qualifications. A rough correspondence between the awards of the two systems is shown below.

Recognised institutions
The providers of courses which lead to HETAC awards were called "recognised institutions", recognised under the Qualifications (Education & Training) Act, 1999 (Section 24). Some of these institutions were granted "delegation of authority" (often referred to as "delegated authority") which allowed them to make HETAC awards in their own name, this was limited to the Institutes of Technology and often to certain award levels at certain institutions.

Section 24 (1)(a)

Regional Technical Colleges
 Athlone Institute of Technology
 Institute of Technology, Blanchardstown
 Institute of Technology, Carlow
 Cork Institute of Technology
 Dún Laoghaire Institute of Art, Design and Technology
 Dundalk Institute of Technology
 Galway-Mayo Institute of Technology
 Letterkenny Institute of Technology
 Limerick Institute of Technology
 Institute of Technology, Sligo
 Institute of Technology, Tallaght
 Institute of Technology, Tralee
 Waterford Institute of Technology

Non-RTC bodies
 National College of Ireland

Section 24 (1)(b)
(Other bodies, public and private sector)
 The American College, Dublin
 Development Studies Centre, Kimmage
 Dorset College
 Dublin Business School
 FISC Ireland Ltd.
 Galway Business School
 Garda Síochána College
 Grafton College of Management Sciences
 Griffith College
 Hibernia College
 ICD Business School
 Institute of Public Administration
 Irish Academy of Public Relations
 Leinster Academy, Leinster Rugby IRFU
 Military College
 Milltown Institute
 National College of Ireland
 National Tourism Development Authority (formerly CERT)
 Newpark Music Centre
 The Open Training College
 Portobello Institute
 Setanta College
 St. Nicholas Montessori College, Ireland
 St. Patrick's, Carlow College
 Thomas Crosbie Holdings Ltd
 Tipperary Institute (Since 2011 part of Limerick Institute of Technology)

Former Providers
Institutions whose degrees were formerly awarded by HETAC, or its forerunner the NCEA before 2002; some no longer exist.
 All Hallows College – degrees awarded by Dublin City University from 2008 to dissolution
 Burren College of Art awarded by NUIG from 2003
 Clonliffe College - humanities diplomas were validated by the NCEA 
 Dublin Institute of Technology – until, in 1998, the DIT got degree-awarding status, its awards were made by TCD and the NCEA
 Froebel College of Education – moved to NUI Maynooth who validate its diplomas since
 HSI Limerick Business School – closed in 2011
 Irish Management Institute – since 2012 UCC validates its degrees
 Kimmage Mission Institute – moved to Milltown Institute in 2003
 LSB College – part of Dublin Business School since 2000
 Lee Business Institute, Cork
 Mid West Business Institute - taken over by Griffith College
 National College of Art and Design – degrees awarded by NCEA from 1984 to June 2003, NUI since
 Newman College, Dublin – closed in 1995
 Portobello College – now part of Dublin Business School
 St. John's College, Waterford - from 1977 NCEA validated diplomas in Theology and Philosophy
 St. Patrick's College, Thurles - diplomas from 1977, and degrees from 1988; since 2011 courses validated by University of Limerick)
 St. Peter's College, Wexford - NCEA validated Theology and Philosophy diplomas until closure in 1999
 Shannon College of Hotel Management – affiliated to NUI since 2001, and NUIG since 2009
 Skerry's Cork Business School – bought by Griffith College in 2005

See also
 Education in the Republic of Ireland
 Further Education and Training Awards Council

References

External links
 Quality and Qualifications Ireland (QQI), official site of HETAC's successor agency

Education in the Republic of Ireland